Monsieur Zenith the Albino is an ambiguous villain created by writer Anthony Skene for the "Sexton Blake" series of detective pulp fiction.

Zenith is an albino, world-weary gentleman thief, originally Romanian nobility but in exile for undetermined reasons. He is full of an ennui which can only be relieved by opium, danger and adventure. Zenith sets himself against Blake not out of avarice but for the joy of the game, and treats Blake with sportsmanship rather than anger or hatred.

Zenith is influenced as much by the anti-heroes of Gothic fiction as he is by the master villains of 20th century pulp fiction, notably Fantômas. Zenith remains one of Blake's most popular adversaries.

M. Zenith was an important influence in the creation of the fantasy character Elric of Melniboné. Elric's creator Michael Moorcock in turn influenced the re-publication of Skene's sole novel, Monsieur Zenith: The Albino, for which he wrote an introduction, and reused the characters in The Metatemporal Detective.

A new collection of five original Zenith short stories, Zenith Lives!: Tales of M.Zenith, the Albino, edited by Stuart Douglas, was published in April 2012 by Obverse Books as Book 4 of The Obverse Quarterly. It includes stories by Stuart Douglas, Sexton Blake scholar Mark Hodder, Paul Magrs, George Mann (a story set in his steampunk universe which also features a crossover character from Mann's Doctor Who novel, Paradox Lost), and Michael Moorcock (featuring Seaton Begg, an alternate version of Sexton Blake).

Other uses
 Zenith is briefly mentioned in Kim Newman's novel Dracula Cha Cha Cha as a possible leader of anti-vampire murders in Rome.
 Zenith (identified with Elric) appears in Alan Moore and Kevin O'Neill's The League of Extraordinary Gentlemen: Black Dossier as a member of Les Hommes Mysterieux, a French version of Britain's League.
 Zenith is the eponymous albino who opposes Sherlock Holmes and John Watson in The Albino's Treasure by Stuart Douglas, part of Titan Publishing's Further Adventures of Sherlock Holmes series of pastiche novels.

References

Further reading

External links
 Moorcock's Miscellany (formerly Tanelorn, Multiverse.org & Moorcock's Weekly Miscellany)
 Jess Nevins' Zenith the Albino Page

Zenith, Monsieur
America's Best Comics characters